NGC 6002 is a star located in the constellation Corona Borealis. It was discovered on 20 April 1873.

See also 
 List of NGC objects (5001–6000)
 List of NGC objects

References 

Corona Borealis
6002